"The Beard" is the 102nd episode of the NBC situation comedy Seinfeld. This is the 16th episode for the sixth season. It aired on February 9, 1995. In this episode, Elaine falls in love with a gay friend while serving as a beard for him, Jerry is subjected to a polygraph test to determine whether or not he has ever seen Melrose Place, and George goes on a blind date with a woman who turns out to be bald.

Plot
Impressed by how attractive George is with his toupée, Kramer sets up a date for him. As he does not have a picture of her, they go to the police station where a sketch artist friend draws them a picture. There, Jerry's eye is caught by Sgt. Cathy Tierny. On their way, Kramer gives Chinese food leftovers to a homeless man. After eating, he refuses to return Kramer's Tupperware container, leaving him no way to save his meals.

Elaine goes to see Swan Lake as a beard for a gay man whose boss is conservative. At Monk's Café, Elaine talks with Jerry about how nice Robert is, and says she want to convert him to heterosexuality.

Jerry is introduced to Sgt. Tierny. She mentions Melrose Place, which Jerry says he has never watched. His manner is unconvincing, so she proposes using a polygraph to see if he is lying. George meets his date, Denise, and discovers she is bald. He goes to Jerry's apartment and vents his disgust at Denise's baldness. Outraged at his hypocrisy, Elaine tears off his toupee and throws it out the window. The homeless man takes it.

Wig-less George tells Jerry he is again himself, and will continue seeing Denise. When Jerry asks his advice on the lie detector test, he tells him that "It's not a lie if you believe it." Jerry takes the polygraph test, and cracks under questioning with regard to controversial plot developments in Melrose Place, which provoke him to vent his strong opinions on those controversies, exposing his familiarity with the series.

After a date, Elaine successfully invites Robert to her apartment. However, Robert quickly converts back to homosexuality. Denise dumps George, who becomes upset at being "rejected by a bald woman". Kramer assumes Denise dumped him because she learned he is bald, and blames Elaine for throwing out his toupee. Elaine refuses to apologize, insisting that the wig made him look like an idiot and act like a jerk. Jerry, Elaine, George, and Kramer all settle down to watch the new episode of Melrose Place.

While standing in police lineups for money, Kramer is falsely accused by the homeless man of a jewelry store robbery.

Production
Writer Carol Leifer got the idea for the episode from a date she went on as a beard for a gay friend of hers who was in banking; the date was painfully awkward, but she thought the situation had comedic potential. The idea of Kramer posing in police lineups came from her reading that David Caruso used to do the same thing when he was a struggling actor.

A lot of material was cut due to time constraints. Jerry and Elaine's meal was to evolve into a chopsticks contest; after Elaine announces she is making her move to convert Robert to heterosexuality, Jerry was to promise to brutally mock her if she fails; and after George tells him "It's not a lie if you believe it," Jerry was to practice this teaching by telling a man it is 2:30 when the clock says it is 4:15, with George nodding in silent approval. In addition, the scene where the lineup participants are told to turn left and then turn right was scripted to end with Kramer singing "The Hokey Pokey", but the show's producers were unable to secure the rights to the song.

References

External links 
 

Seinfeld (season 6) episodes
1995 American television episodes
American LGBT-related television episodes